Rafael García Granados (February 20, 1893 – 1955) was a Mexican historian.

Books
Huexotsingo. La ciudad y el convento franciscano (1934)
Xochimilco (1934)
Sillería del coro de la Antigua iglesia de San Agustín, 2 volumes (1941)
Diccionario biográfico de historia Antigua de Méjico, 3 volumes (1952–1953)
El hospital de Jesús, published posthumously (1956)

References

1893 births
1955 deaths
20th-century Mexican historians
Historians of Mexico
Mexican Mesoamericanists
Historians of Mesoamerica
20th-century Mesoamericanists